1150 Achaia;) is a stony background asteroid from the inner regions of the asteroid belt. It was discovered by Karl Reinmuth at Heidelberg Observatory on 2 September 1929. It is named for the Greek region of Achaia.

Discovery 

Achaia was discovered on 2 September 1929, by German astronomer Karl Reinmuth at Heidelberg Observatory in southwest Germany. Ten nights later, it was independently discovered by Friedrich Schwassmann and Arno Wachmann at Bergedorf. The body's observation arc begins at Heidelberg, five days after its first and official discovery observation.<

Orbit and classification 

Located in the orbital region of the Flora family, one of the largest, yet disputed families of the main-belt, Achaia is a non-family asteroid of the main belt's background population when applying the hierarchical clustering method to its proper orbital elements. It orbits the Sun at a distance of 1.7–2.6 AU once every 3 years and 3 months (1,184 days). Its orbit has an eccentricity of 0.20 and an inclination of 2° with respect to the ecliptic.

Naming 

This minor planet is named for the region Achaea (or "Achaia") in Western Greece. It is located in the northern part of the Peloponnese peninsula and borders on the gulfs of Patras and Corinth. Naming citation was first mentioned in The Names of the Minor Planets by Paul Herget in 1955.

Physical characteristics 

In the Tholen-like taxonomy of the Small Solar System Objects Spectroscopic Survey (S3OS2), Achaia is a common, stony S-type asteroid, while in the survey's SMASS (Bus–Binzel)-like taxonomic variant, it is an Sl-subtype, which transitions from the S-type to the uncommon L-type asteroid.

Photometry 

A rotational lightcurve of Achaia was obtained from photometric observations by Czech astronomer Petr Pravec at Ondřejov Observatory in October 2007. It gave a well-defined rotation period of 60.99 hours with a brightness variation of 0.72 magnitude.

Published in 2016, two additional lightcurves were derived from modeled photometric data using various sources.

While not being a slow rotator, Achaia has a notably longer period than the vast majority of asteroids, which typically rotate every 2 to 20 hours once around their axis. Also, the body's changes in brightness are relatively high and indicate that it has a non-spheroidal shape.

Diameter and albedo 

According to the surveys carried out by the Japanese Akari satellite and NASA's Wide-field Infrared Survey Explorer with its subsequent NEOWISE mission, Achaia measures between 7.689 and 8.16 kilometers in diameter, and its surface has an albedo between 0.234 and 0.251. The Collaborative Asteroid Lightcurve Link assumes an albedo of 0.24 – taken from 8 Flora, the Flora family's principal body and namesake – and calculates a diameter of 7.82 kilometers based on an absolute magnitude of 12.7.

Notes

References

External links 
 Lightcurve Database Query (LCDB), at www.minorplanet.info
 Dictionary of Minor Planet Names, Google books
 Asteroids and comets rotation curves, CdR – Geneva Observatory, Raoul Behrend
 Discovery Circumstances: Numbered Minor Planets (1)-(5000) – Minor Planet Center
 
 

001150
Discoveries by Karl Wilhelm Reinmuth
Named minor planets
19290902